Anoeta is also a neighborhood in San Sebastián/Donostia, Spain, home to a namesake football stadium and cycle track.

Anoeta is a town located in the province of Gipuzkoa, in the autonomous community of Basque Country, in the north of Spain.

References

External links
 Official Website Information available in Spanish and Basque.
 ANOETA in the Bernardo Estornés Lasa - Auñamendi Encyclopedia (Euskomedia Fundazioa) Information available in Spanish

Municipalities in Gipuzkoa